Cyprinia is a monotypic genus of plants in the family Apocynaceae. It contains a single species, Cyprinia gracilis, a climber with yellow flowers.

The genus is closely related to Periploca and is treated as a synonym of that genus by some sources. It is native to Cyprus and a few localities in southern Turkey.

References

Apocynaceae
Monotypic Apocynaceae genera
Flora of Cyprus